Carolyn D. Wright (January 6, 1949 – January 12, 2016) was an American poet. She was a MacArthur Fellow, a Guggenheim Fellow, and the Poet Laureate of Rhode Island.

Background
C. D. Wright was born in Mountain Home, Arkansas, to a chancery judge and a court reporter. 
She earned a BA in French from Memphis State University (now the University of Memphis) in 1971 and briefly attended law school before leaving to pursue an MFA from the University of Arkansas, which she received in 1976. Her poetry thesis was titled Alla Breve Loving.

In 1977, the publishing company founded by Frank Stanford, Lost Roads Publishers, published Wright's first collection, Room Rented by A Single Woman. After Stanford died in 1978, Wright took over Lost Roads, continuing its mission of publishing new poets and starting the practice of publishing translations. In 1979, she moved to San Francisco, where she met poet Forrest Gander. Wright and Gander married in 1983 and had a son, Brecht. The husband and wife were co-editors at Lost Roads until 2005.

In 1981, Wright and Gander moved to Dolores Hidalgo, Mexico, where she completed her third book of poems, Translation of the Gospel Back into Tongues. In 1983, they moved to Providence, Rhode Island, where she began teaching at Brown University as the Israel J. Kapstein Professor of English. Over the next 30 years, Wright won many major American literary prizes (including fellowships from the Lila Acheson Wallace, Guggenheim, Lannan, and MacArthur Foundations) while publishing one of the most eclectic bodies of poetic work of her generation. The cyclical erotic and tormented fragments of Just Whistle are as distinct from the compressed, sensual narratives of Translation of the Gospel Back into Tongues as from the lyrical southern paeans of Further Adventures with You. Perhaps her most original and internationally influential publications are the book-length works Deepstep Come Shining, One Big Self, and One With Others. Each developed, in new directions, Wright's formally innovative and fundamentally ethical meditations on the South, on race relations, on incarceration, and on the lives of the unsung. Together, those books helped to define and extend the possibilities for documentary poetics in the twenty-first century. In 2013, Wright was elected a chancellor of the Academy of American Poets. Stephanie Burt has described Wright as an Elliptical Poet, but Burt did not use that description in an essay she published as a tribute to Wright just after Wright's death. As Joel Brouwer has said, she "belongs to a school of exactly one."

C.D. Wright died on January 12, 2016, six days after her 67th birthday. Her brother, Warren Wright, reported that she "died peacefully in her sleep of thrombosis, a clot, after an overly long flight from Chile." At the time of her death, she was living in Barrington, Rhode Island.

Poetry

Wright's poetry  is rooted in a sense of place and time and often employs distinct voices in dialogue, particularly those of the American South.  Her work is formally inventive and often documentary in spirit, in the sense that it honors those whose stories or voices might be lost, were it not for her own writing. Her diction mixes high and low to surprising effect, and her range of reference is both broad and deep, including phrases from other languages, allusions to other poems, and pieces of conversation. Her books include precisely distilled lyrics such as those collected in Tremble as well as book-length poems beginning with Just Whistle, her first collaboration with photographer Deborah Luster.

In a 2001 interview with Kent Johnson, Wright said,

As to my own aesthetic associations—affiliations, sympathies—I have never belonged to a notable element of writers who identified with one another partly because I come from Arkansas, specifically that part of Arkansas known for its resistance-to-joining, a non-urban environment where readily identifiable groups and sub-groups are less likely to form.

In the same interview, she states,

The theoretically-driven San Francisco poets who were in cahoots with poets in New York and conversant with European vanguard movements—they provided me with a need to become critically aware of my back-home ways; sharpened me to a degree. I'm grateful for the exposure, the education. I am indebted to particular poets' work from that point in time, but I am not an intellectual in the sense that qualifies or requires me to belong to a manifestoed-group. And of course one comes to take some pride in one's own outsider status.

Wright published literary maps of both Rhode Island and Arkansas. Wright's later work includes String Light; Deepstep Come Shining, a book-length poem; and One Big Self: Prisoners of Louisiana, another collaboration with photographer Deborah Luster. One Big Self: An Investigation contains just the poems. Her poems are featured in American Alphabets: 25 Contemporary Poets (2006) and many other anthologies. One With Others mixes investigative journalism, history and poetry to explore homegrown civil rights incidents and the critical role her mentor, a brilliant and difficult woman, played in a little-known 1969 March Against Fear in her native Arkansas. Shortly after Wright's death in January 2016, Copper Canyon Press published The Poet, the Lion, Talking Pictures, El Farolito, a Wedding in St. Roch, the Big Box Store, the Warp in the Mirror, Spring, Midnights, Fire & All, a book of prosimetric essays, and ShallCross, a book of both short- and long-form poems.

Awards

 1987 Guggenheim Fellowship
 1989 Whiting Award
 1994-99 Poet Laureate of the state of Rhode Island
 1999 Foundation for Contemporary Arts, grant
 2004 MacArthur Fellowship
 2005 Robert Creeley Award
 2009 Rising, Falling, Hovering winner Griffin Poetry Prize
 2010 One With Others, finalist, National Book Award (Poetry)
2010 One With Others, winner, National Book Critics Circle Award (Poetry)
2011 One With Others, winner, Lenore Marshall Poetry Prize

Works
This list of works has been taken mostly from C. D. Wright's entry at the Academy of American Poets web page titled "C. D. Wright".

 1977: Room Rented By A Single Woman (Lost Roads)
 1979: Terrorism (Lost Roads)
 1981: Translation of the Gospel Back into Tongues (State University of New York Press)
 1986: Further Adventures with You (Carnegie Mellon University Press)
 1991: String Light (University of Georgia Press)
 1993: Just Whistle: A Valentine (Kelsey Street Press) - with photographs by Deborah Luster
 1996: Tremble (Ecco)
 1998: Deepstep Come Shining (Copper Canyon Press)
 2002: Steal Away: New and Selected Poems (Copper Canyon Press) [shortlisted for the 2003 International Griffin Poetry Prize]
 2003: One Big Self: Prisoners of Louisiana (Twin Palms) – with photographs by Deborah Luster
 2005: Cooling Time: An American Poetry Vigil (Copper Canyon Press)
 2007: One Big Self: An Investigation (Copper Canyon Press) 
 2008: Rising, Falling, Hovering (Copper Canyon Press) [winner of the 2009 International Griffin Poetry Prize]
 2009: 40 Watts (Octopus Books)
 2010: One With Others [[a little book of her days]] (Copper Canyon Press)
 2011: Jean Valentine Abridged: Writing a Word; Changing It (Albion Press)
 2012: The Other Hand (Horse Less Press)
 2016: The Poet, The Lion, Talking Pictures, El Farolito, A Wedding in St. Roch, The Big Box Store, The Warp in the Mirror, Spring, Midnights, Fire & All (Copper Canyon Press) – essays
 2016: ShallCross (Copper Canyon Press)

References

External links

Author Website
Griffin Poetry Prize biography
Profile at The Whiting Foundation
C. D. Wright—The Academy of American Poets
"Interview", Kent Johnson, Jacket Magazine
"Only the crossing counts," Slate magazine
"Bent Tones" by C. D. Wright
Overview Wright's work at Open Letters
C.D. Wright (1949-2016) tribute by Bloodaxe Books
C. D. Wright Papers. Yale Collection of American Literature, Beinecke Rare Book and Manuscript Library.

1949 births
2016 deaths
MacArthur Fellows
Poets from Arkansas
Poets from Rhode Island
Brown University faculty
People from Mountain Home, Arkansas
Iowa Writers' Workshop faculty
Poets Laureate of Rhode Island
American women poets
20th-century American poets
21st-century American poets
20th-century American women writers
21st-century American women writers
American women academics